Qaleh Now (also Romanized as Qal`eh Now) is a village in Azghand Rural District, Shadmehr District, Mahvelat County, Razavi Khorasan Province, Iran. At the 2006 census, its population was 359, in 79 families.

References 

Populated places in Mahvelat County